Suominen Corporation is a Finnish company that makes nonwovens for wiping and hygiene products, and for healthcare applications. Suominen is the global market leader in nonwovens for wipes, and one of the world's biggest nonwovens manufacturers. Suominen's nonwovens are made into wet wipes, sanitary towels and swabs, for example.

Suominen's history began in Finland in 1898, but the oldest of the company's subsidiaries was founded in 1767. Between 1982 and 2001, Suominen was part of the Lassila & Tikanoja Group.

The company's shares are listed on Nasdaq Helsinki. The company has production plants in the United States, Brazil, Spain and Italy as well as Finland and it employs approximately 710 persons.

History

J. W. Suominen Oy (1898–1982)
Juho Wiktor Suominen started a tannery workshop in Nakkila, south-western Finland, in 1898. J.W. Suominen's Nahkatehdas (“Leather Factory”) became a limited liability company in 1928.

The Finnish shoe industry was in decline in the 1960s, and J. W. Suominen expanded from leather to begin manufacturing fiber products. It used non-woven fabric to make cotton wool, wadding, wall-to-wall carpeting and disposable wipes. The company exited the leather industry in the 1970s.

Part of Lassila & Tikanoja (1982–2001)
Lassila & Tikanoja bought J. W. Suominen Oy in early 1982.

Suominen Yhtymä Oyj (2001–2011)
In September 2001, Lassila & Tikanoja was divided into two companies: Lassila & Tikanoja Oyj ja Suominen Yhtymä Oyj.

In 2011, after the purchase of Ahlstrom's Home & Personal business, that is, wiping products, Suominen became the global market leader in nonwovens designed for wiping products sold in rolls. The deal included production plants in Europe, the United States and Brazil. As a result, Suominen almost doubled in size and, in order to finance the deal, the company organized a share and conversion issue in October 2011, which made Ahlstrom the biggest shareholder in Suominen. This increased Suominen's net sales to EUR 500 million and its number of staff to 1,300, with operations in 10 countries. Nina Kopola was appointed President & CEO in December 2011.

Suominen Corporation (2012–)
In April 2012, the company name was shortened to Suominen Oyj (in English Suominen Corporation).

In 2013, the company headquarters and domicile were transferred from Tampere to Helsinki.

In 2014, the majority of shares in the loss-making Flexibles business area were sold to a UK private equity firm. After this, Suominen became a company dealing exclusively in nonwovens.

President & CEO Nina Kopola resigned in August 2018. Tapio Engström acted as temporary President & CEO. Pekka Ojanpää was scheduled to begin as President & CEO in December 2018, but died before he could do so. Petri Helsky started work as Suominen Corporation's President & CEO in January 2019.

In early 2020, Suominen Corporation, along with seven other listed companies, was transferred to a new market value category following an annual review of Nasdaq's market value categories. The company was transferred from SMEs to small companies. In April Suominen and VTT told that they had created a new multilayer fabric that could be used in respirators which was produced in Nakkila.  The company achieved the highest turnover and profit in its history. The pandemic increased the demand for wiper products and Suominen's customers made larger orders than usually.

Organization
Suominen Group's parent company is Suominen Corporation, headquartered in Helsinki, Finland. In 2020, the company had a total of 689 employees, of which 304 were located in the United States, 137 in Italy and 129 in Finland. The company also operated in Spain and Brazil.

The company has divided its operations between two business areas: the Americas and Europe. In 2019, the Americas accounted for 64 percent of the company's net sales.

Markets
Suominen is one of the world's largest manufacturers of nonwovens, and is the global market leader in nonwovens for wipes. The next-biggest manufacturer, the American consumer goods giant Kimberley-Clark, manufactures such fabrics primarily for its own branded products. In 2018, Suominen held about 20 percent of the market. About 63 percent of the company's turnover comes from South and North America while the rest comes from Europe.

Products
Suominen manufactures rolls of nonwovens for wiping and hygiene products, and for healthcare needs. Nonwovens produced by the company are used to make products such as childcare and other wipes, sanitary towels, swabs and respirators.

Materials
Suominen's portfolio of responsible products includes products made from renewable, recycled or plastic-free raw materials and compostable or fully degradable nonwovens. Suominen uses cellulose-based fibres, such as viscose and lyocell, as raw materials for its responsible fibre fabrics. They accounted for more than half of its production in 2020. 

44% of its products are made from oil-based materials such as polypropylene and polyester.

Suominen started researching new products in its innovation group in 2019 and the following year it set up a project called New Fiber Center, that explores new organic fibre fabrics that could be made from hemp, for example. The products are being tested in Nakkila and Windsor Locks in the US. Hemp is similar to cotton as a raw material but requires less land, water and pesticides to grow. Suominen is also interested in flax and straw.

References

External links
 
 Suominen Nonwovens business unit profile by Nonwovens Industry

Textile companies of Finland
Companies listed on Nasdaq Helsinki